Chemical ecology is the study of chemically-mediated interactions between living organisms, and the effects of those interactions on the demography, behavior and ultimately evolution of the organisms involved. It is thus a vast and highly interdisciplinary field. Chemical ecologists seek to identify the specific molecules (i.e. semiochemicals) that function as signals mediating community or ecosystem processes and to understand the evolution of these signals. The substances that serve in such roles are typically small, readily-diffusible organic molecules, but can also include larger molecules and small peptides.

In practice, chemical ecology relies extensively on chromatographic techniques, such as thin-layer chromatography, high performance liquid chromatography, and gas chromatography, to isolate and identify bioactive metabolites. To identify molecules with the sought-after activity, chemical ecologists often make use of bioassay-guided fractionation. Today, chemical ecologists also incorporate genetic and genomic techniques to understand the biosynthetic and signal transduction pathways underlying chemically-mediated interactions.

Plant chemical ecology 

Plant chemical ecology focuses on the role of chemical cues and signals in mediating interactions of plants with their biotic environment (e.g. microorganisms, phytophagous insects, and pollinators).

Plant-insect interactions 

The chemical ecology of plant-insect interaction is a significant subfield of chemical ecology. In particular, plants and insects are often involved in a chemical evolutionary arms race. As plants develop chemical defenses to herbivory, insects which feed on them evolve immunity to these poisons, and in some cases, repurpose these poisons for their own chemical defense against predators. For example, caterpillars of the monarch butterfly sequester cardenolide toxins from their milkweed host-plants and are able to use them as an anti-predator defense. Whereas most insects are killed by cardenolides, which are potent inhibitors of the Na+/K+-ATPase, monarchs have evolved resistance to the toxin over their long evolutionary history with milkweeds. Other examples of sequestration include the tobacco hornworm Manduca sexta,  which use nicotine sequestered from tobacco plants in predator defense; and the bella moth, which secretes a quinone-containing froth to deter predators obtained from feeding on Crotalaria plants as a caterpillar.

Chemical ecologists also study chemical interactions involved in indirect defenses of plants, such as the attraction of predators and parasitoids through herbivore-induced volatile organic compounds (VOCs).

Plant-microbe interactions 

Plant interactions with microorganisms are also mediated by chemistry. Both constitutive and induced secondary metabolites are involved in plant defense against pathogens and chemical signals are also important in the establishment and maintenance of resource mutualisms. For example, both rhizobia and mycorrhizae depend on chemical signals, such as strigolactones and flavanoids exuded from plant roots, in order to find a suitable host.

For microbes to gain access to the plant, they must be able to penetrate the layer of wax that forms a hydrophobic barrier on the plant's surface. Many plant-pathogenic microbes secrete enzymes that break down these cuticular waxes. Mutualistic microbes on the other hand may be granted access. For example, rhizobia secrete Nod factors that trigger the formation of an infection thread in receptive plants. The rhizobial symbionts can then travel through this infection thread to gain entrance to root cells.

Mycorrhizae and other fungal endophytes may also benefit their host plants by producing antibiotics or other secondary metabolites that ward off harmful fungi, bacteria and herbivores in the soil. Some entomopathogenic fungi can also form endophytic relationships with plants and may even transfer nitrogen directly to plants from insects they consume in the surrounding soil.

Plant-plant interactions

Allelopathy 

Many plants produce secondary metabolites (known as allelochemicals) that can inhibit the growth of neighboring plants. Many examples of allelopathic competition have been controversial due to the difficulty of positively demonstrating a causal link between allelopathic substances and plant performance under natural conditions, but it is widely accepted that phytochemicals are involved in competitive interactions between plants. One of the clearest examples of allelopathy is the production of juglone by walnut trees, whose strong competitive effects on neighboring plants were recognized in the ancient world as early as 36 BC.

Plant-plant communication 

Plants communicate with each other through both airborne and below-ground chemical cues. For example, when damaged by an herbivore, many plants emit an altered bouquet of volatile organic compounds (VOCs). Various C6 fatty acids and alcohols (sometimes known as green leaf volatiles) are often emitted from damaged leaves, since they are break-down products of plant cell membranes. These compounds (familiar to many as the smell of freshly mown grass) can be perceived by neighboring plants where they may trigger the induction of plant defenses.  It is debated to what extent this communication reflects a history of active selection due to mutual benefit as opposed to "eavesdropping" on cues unintentionally emitted by neighboring plants.

Marine chemical ecology

Defense 

Many marine organisms use chemical defenses to deter predators. For example, some crustaceans and mesograzers, such as the Pseudamphithoides incurvaria, use toxic algae and seaweeds as a shield against predation by covering their bodies in these plants. These plants produce diterpenes such as pachydictyol-A and dictyol-E, which have been shown to deter predators. Other marine organisms produce chemicals endogenously to defend themselves. For example, the finless sole (Pardachirus marmoratus) produces a toxin that paralyzes the jaws of would-be predators. Many zoanthids produce potent toxins, such as palytoxin, which is one of the most poisonous known substances. Some species of these zooanthids are very brightly colored, which may be indicative of aposematic defense.

Reproduction 
Many marine organisms use pheromones to find mates. For example, male sea lampreys attract ovulating females by emitting a bile that can be detected many meters downstream. Other processes can be more complex, such as the mating habits of crabs. Due to the fact that female crabs can only mate during a short period after moults from her shell, female crabs produces pheromones before she begins to moult in order to attract a mate. Male crabs will detect these pheromones and defend their potential mate until she has finished molted. However, due to the cannibalistic tendencies of crabs, the female produces an additional pheromone to suppresses cannibalistic instincts in her male guardian. These pheromones are very potent -- so much so that they can induce male crabs to try to copulate with rocks or sponges that have been coated in pheromone by researchers.

Dominance 

Dominance among crustaceans is also mediated through chemical cues. When crustaceans fight to determine dominance they urinate into the water. Later, if they meet again, both individuals can recognize each other by pheromones contained in their urine, allowing them to avoid a fight, if dominance has already been established. When a lobster encounters the urine of another individual, it will act differently according to the perceived status of the urinator (e.g. more submissively when exposed to the urine of a more dominant crab, or more boldly when exposed to the urine of a subdominant individual). When individuals are unable to communicate through urine, fights may be longer and more unpredictable.

Applications of chemical ecology

Pest Control 
Chemical ecology has been utilized in the development of sustainable pest control strategies. Semiochemicals (especially insect sex pheromones) are widely used in integrated pest management for surveillance, trapping and mating disruption of pest insects. Unlike conventional insecticides, pheromone-based methods of pest control are generally species-specific, non-toxic and extremely potent. In forestry, mass trapping has been used successfully to reduce tree mortality from bark beetle infestations in spruce and pine forests and from palm weevils in palm plantations. In an aquatic system, a sex pheromone from the invasive sea lamprey has been registered by the United States Environmental Protection Agency for deployment in traps. A strategy has been developed in Kenya to protect cattle from trypanosomiasis spread by Tsetse fly by applying a mixture of repellent odors derived from a non-host animal, the waterbuck.

The successful push-pull agricultural pest management system makes use of chemical cues from intercropped plants to sustainably increase agricultural yields. The efficacy of push-pull agriculture relies on multiple forms of chemical communication. Though the push-pull technique was invented as a strategy to control stem-boring moths, such as Chilo partellus, through the manipulation of volatile host-finding cues, it was later discovered that allelopathic substances exuded by the roots of Desmodium spp. also contribute to the suppression of the damaging parasitic weed, Striga.

Drug development and biochemistry discoveries 

A large proportion of commercial drugs (e.g. aspirin, ivermectin, cyclosporin, taxol) are derived from natural products that evolved due to their involvement in ecological interactions. While it has been proposed that the study of natural history could contribute to the discovery of new drug leads, most drugs derived from natural products were not discovered due to prior knowledge of their ecological functions. However, many fundamental biological discoveries have been facilitated by the study of plant toxins. For example, the characterization of the nicotinic acetylcholine receptor, the first neurotransmitter receptor to be identified, ensued from investigations into the mechanisms of action of curare and nicotine. Similarly, the muscarinic acetylcholine receptor takes its name from the fungal toxin muscarine.

History of chemical ecology

After 1950 

In 1959, Adolf Butenandt identified the first intraspecific chemical signal (bombykol) from the silk moth, Bombyx mori, with material obtained by grinding up 500,000 moths. The same year, Karlson and Lüscher proposed the term 'pheromone' to describe this type of signal. Also in 1959, Gottfried S. Fraenkel also published his landmark paper, "The Raison d'être of Secondary Plant Substances", arguing that plant secondary metabolites are not metabolic waste products, but actually evolved to protect plants from consumers. Together, these papers marked the beginning of modern chemical ecology. In 1964, Paul R. Ehrlich and Peter H. Raven coauthored a paper proposing their influential theory of escape and radiate coevolution, which suggested that an evolutionary "arms-race" between plants and insects can explain the extreme diversification of plants and insects. The idea that plant metabolites could not only contribute to the survival of individual plants, but could also influence broad macroevolutionary patterns, would turn out to be highly influential.

In the 1960s and 1970s, a number of plant biologists, ecologists, and entomologists expanded this line of research on the ecological roles of plant secondary metabolites. During this period, Thomas Eisner and his close collaborator Jerrold Meinwald published a series seminal papers on chemical defenses in plants and insects. A number of other scientists at Cornell were also working on topics related to chemical ecology during this period, including Paul Feeny, Wendell L. Roelofs, Robert Whittaker and Richard B. Root. In 1968, the first course in chemical ecology was initiated at Cornell. In 1970, Eisner, Whittaker and the ant biologist William L. Brown, Jr. coined the terms allomone (to describe semiochemicals that benefit the emitter, but not the receiver) and kairomone (to describe semiochemicals that benefit the receiver only). Whittaker and Feeny published an influential review paper in Science the following year, summarizing the recent research on the ecological roles of chemical defenses in a wide variety of plants and animals and likely introducing Whittaker's new taxonomy of semiochemicals to a broader scientific audience. Around this time, Lincoln Brower also published a series of important ecological studies on monarch sequestration of cardenolides. Brower has been credited with popularizing the term "ecological chemistry" which appeared in the title of a paper he published in Science in 1968 and again the following year in an article he wrote for Scientific American, where the term also appeared on the front cover under an image of a giant bluejay towering over two monarch butterflies.

The specialized Journal of Chemical Ecology was established in 1975 and the journal, Chemoecology, was founded in 1990. In 1984, the International Society of Chemical Ecology was established and in 1996, the Max Planck Institute of Chemical Ecology was founded in Jena, Germany.

See also
 Chemical defense
 Semiochemical
 Chemical ecologists
 May R. Berenbaum
 Lincoln Brower
 Thomas Eisner
 Jerrold Meinwald
 Wendell L. Roelofs
 Escape and radiate coevolution

References

Further reading

    

 
 
 
 
 
 
 Putnam, A. R. (1988). "Allelochemicals from Plants as Herbicides" Weed Technology. 2(4): 510–518.

External links

 International Society of Chemical Ecology